Alfred Dennis (born Alfred Medinets; December 26, 1922 – August 1, 2016) was an American film and television actor. He is known for playing Irving in the 1979 film The Jerk and the Barber in the 1976 film The Shootist.

Born in the United States, Dennis guest-starred in numerous television programs including Knots Landing, The Monkees, Who's the Boss?, The A-Team, Monk, Perfect Strangers, Fantasy Island and The Golden Girls. He died in August 2016 in Los Angeles, California, at the age of 93.

Filmography

Film

Television

References

External links 

Rotten Tomatoes profile

1922 births
2016 deaths
American male film actors
American male television actors
20th-century American male actors
21st-century American male actors